Depressaria silesiaca is a moth of the family Depressariidae. It is found in Great Britain, Fennoscandia, Estonia, Latvia, Russia, Poland, the Czech Republic, Austria, Switzerland and Italy.

The wingspan is 13–16 mm. Adults have been recorded from April to October.

The larvae feed on Achillea millefolium and Tanacetum vulgare. They live within a spun or rolled leaf.

References

External links
lepiforum.de

Moths described in 1870
Depressaria
Moths of Europe